Napsbury railway station was built by the Midland Railway in 1905 on its line to St Pancras station.

It was never more than an island platform between the slow lines, with a siding serving the Middlesex County Asylum at Napsbury, and closed in 1959.

20 July 1905 - Napsbury first and only station master John Thomas Cartledge began work, when he moved in 1910, supervision of the station moved to the station master at St Albans station

References

Disused railway stations in Hertfordshire
Railway stations in Great Britain opened in 1905
Railway stations in Great Britain closed in 1959
Former Midland Railway stations